Freswick or Skirsa, is a small remote hamlet, overlooking Freswick Bay to the east, in  eastern Caithness, Scottish Highlands and is in the Scottish council area of Highland. The village of Skirza lies directly northeast of Freswick.

Name 
The name Freswick probably originates from the Old Norwegian Frøysvík meaning 'Freyr's bay'. Current Fresvik is a village in Norway. It is also suggested that Freswick stemms from 'Frisians' wick', similar to the toponyms Vreeswijk and Friezenwijk in the Netherlands. There is a connection with former Frisia and Freswick concerning early-medieval brooches that have been found. A fragments of Viking-Age fibula, so-called penannular brooch type, found at Freswick by Bremner in 1939 has similarities to a fibula fragment found at the hamlet of Hallumerhoek, province Friesland in the Netherlands.

See also
 Fresvik
 Vreeswijk

References

Populated places in Caithness
Orkneyinga saga places